La Chapelle-sous-Brancion is a commune in the eastern French department of Saône-et-Loire.

Sites and monuments
 Château de Nobles

See also
 Communes of the Saône-et-Loire department

References

Communes of Saône-et-Loire